The International Agreements Committee is a select committee of the House of Lords in the Parliament of the United Kingdom. Originally a sub-committee of the European Union Committee, the International Agreements Committee has a remit to examine all treaties presented before Parliament as per the Constitutional Reform and Governance Act 2010, as well as to consider negotiations with foreign states and international bodies.

The committee's functions are largely shaped by post-Brexit foreign relations of the United Kingdom.

Membership
As of January 2023, the membership of the committee is as follows:

References

External links
International Agreements Committee official page

Committees of the House of Lords